Jehovah may refer to:
Jehovah, a reading of the name of God in Abrahamic religions
Jehovah 1, an important character in the parody religion, Church of the SubGenius
Jehovah Wanyonyi, a Kenyan mystic who claims to be God
Jehovah's Witnesses
Assemblies Jehovah Shammah

See also
Yahweh (disambiguation)